The Sims Spark'd is a reality competition television series that premiered on the TBS network on July 17, 2020. The first season of the series, filmed from December 9 to 14, 2019, features 12 contestants, selected from those known to feature The Sims in their online gaming channels, tasked with challenges within The Sims 4 to create characters and stories following the challenge's themes and limitations. Each competitor's creation is judged by a panel consisting of EA Maxis developer and The Sims 4 producer Dave Miotke ( "SimGuruNinja" within The Sims community), YouTube personality Kelsey Impicciche (known for her "100 Baby Challenge"), and singer/songwriter Tayla Parx, who is also a voice actress in The Sims 4. The series is hosted by American Idol season 14 finalist Rayvon Owen.

Each episode of the first season premiered on TBS on Friday nights at 11pm ET/PT in the United States, and was later uploaded on YouTube channel BuzzFeed Multiplayer the following Monday for international audiences at 8am Eastern. Challenges were posted to The Sims 4 website following the series premiere to seek potential contestants for a second season.

Format 
At the beginning of the competition, all 12 contestants were assigned to teams via random draw. Each team is composed of a Stylist (handling the designs), Builder (in charge of buildings), and the Storyteller (invents the stories related to Sims). For every episode, they have to fulfill specific challenges as a team based around several scenarios.

Cast

Notes

Challenge Results

Episodes 
Each episode premiered on TBS on Friday nights at 11pm ET/PT and on YouTube channel BuzzFeed Multiplayer the following Monday at 8am Eastern.

Development
As a project in planning, Spark'd had a long lead time as Electronic Arts wanted to combine the players' personal stories with a TV reality format filled with challenges. The company decided to make the show in-house instead of outsourcing it to anyone else. EA was worried about the specifics of translating a video game into another medium, and thus tried not to diverge from the main aspects of The Sims while putting an effort to represent diversity. The initial idea was to develop Spark'd as a short-length show for the millennials. However, after the initial filming in December 2019, the COVID-19 pandemic prompted EA to retool their marketing plans from scratch. The Sims Spark'd was found to be a fit for a TBS's ELeague Friday programming block change to include shows that are not just aimed at dedicated gamers.

During and following the broadcast of the first season, EA posted Spark'd challenges on The Sims 4 website for players to complete in-game and upload to the website for the opportunity to be selected for a potential second season of The Sims Spark'd.

References

External links 
 
 

Reality competition television series
Television shows about video games
2020 American television series debuts
TBS (American TV channel) original programming
The Sims